This is the list of the 13 members of the European Parliament for Denmark in the 2014 to 2019 session. The members were elected in the 2014 European Parliament election in Denmark


List

References 

Denmark
List
2009